James Henry Norick (January 23, 1920 – March 4, 2015) was an American politician. He served as mayor of Oklahoma City, Oklahoma, from 1959 to 1963 and 1967 to 1971. He was a member of the Democratic party. Norick also served on Oklahoma City council prior to serving as mayor, from 1951 to 1955. His son, Ron Norick, was also a mayor of Oklahoma City, serving from 1987 to 1998. He was the son of Henry Calvin and Ruth Norick. His father owned a printing business. James Norick attended the Oklahoma Military Academy and served in the United States Navy from 1942 to 1945. Norick died on March 4, 2015, at the age of 95.

References

1920 births
2015 deaths
Classen School of Advanced Studies alumni
Mayors of Oklahoma City
Oklahoma city council members
Oklahoma Democrats